Raúl Mendoza  (born November 25, 1991) is a Mexican professional wrestler currently signed to WWE, where he performs on the SmackDown brand under the name Cruz Del Toro and is a member of Legado Del Fantasma.

Professional wrestling career

Early career
Mendoza made his professional wrestling debut on September 16, 2006. Over the next ten years, Mendoza would primarily compete on the Mexican independent circuit, most notably appearing for  independent promotions Desastre Total Ultraviolento (DTU), Perros del Mal (PdM), and the International Wrestling Revolution Group (IWRG), while also appearing for national promotion Lucha Libre AAA Worldwide (AAA) and Japanese promotion Pro Wrestling Noah.

WWE (2016–present)

Cruiserweight Championship pursuit (2016–2020) 
In June 2016, Mendoza was announced as a participant in the WWE Cruiserweight Classic,  a 32-man single-elimination tournament featuring competitors 205 lbs. and under, as a representative from Mexico. Mendoza was eliminated from the tournament in the first round by The Brian Kendrick. Following the Cruiserweight Classic, Mendoza was signed by WWE, who assigned him to compete in the NXT developmental territory.  Mendoza made his NXT debut on the May 25, 2017 episode, being defeated by Velveteen Dream. On February 9, 2018, at an NXT live event, Mendoza won a battle royal to become the number one contender to the NXT Championship. The following day on February 10, Mendoza was defeated by NXT Champion Andrade "Cien" Almas. Mendoza made his 205 Live debut on the July 23, 2019 episode of 205 Live, where he teamed with Humberto Carrillo to defeat Kalisto and Gran Metalik. On the November 1 episode of 205 Live, Mendoza unsuccessfully challenged the NXT Cruiserweight Champion Lio Rush.

Legado Del Fantasma (2020–present) 

On the March 11 episode of NXT, Mendoza was abducted by a group of masked men and thrown into a van in the parking lot in what was originally an interview of Mia Yim. On the April 1 episode of NXT, Joaquin Wilde was similarly abducted during a post-match interview. On the June 10 episode of NXT, Mendoza made his return as he along with Wilde (who was also kidnapped) were revealed as the mysterious masked men and they aligned themselves with Santos Escobar as they attacked Drake Maverick, thus establishing himself as a heel. At night one of The Great American Bash, the trio was named "Legado Del Fantasma". In their first match as a team, Legado del Fantasma defeated Maverick and Breezango in a six-man tag team match on the second night of The Great American Bash.

Wilde and Mendoza would start competing in NXT's tag team division and 205 Live. At NXT TakeOver XXX, Wilde and Mendoza competed against Breezango (Fandango and Tyler Breeze) and the team of Oney Lorcan and Danny Burch in a triple threat match to determine the #1 contenders for the NXT Tag Team Championship but were unsuccessful in winning the match. On night one of Super Tuesday, Legado lost to Isaiah "Swerve" Scott and Breezango in a street fight when Scott pinned Escobar, leading up to a match between Escobar and Scott for Escobar's Cruiserweight Championship at NXT TakeOver 31, where Wilde and Mendoza assisted Escobar in retaining the title.

In 2021, Wilde and Mendoza entered the 2021 Dusty Rhodes Tag Team Classic in which they lost to the eventual winners MSK (Nash Carter and Wes Lee) in the semifinal round. They also faced MSK and Grizzled Young Veterans (James Drake and Zack Gibson) on night one of NXT TakeOver: Stand & Deliver in a match with the Tag Team titles on the line, which MSK won. At NXT Takeover: In Your House, Legado del Fantasma would face NXT North American champion, Bronson Reed and NXT Tag Team champions, MSK in a winners take all, six-man tag team match in which, Legado del Fantasma were unsuccessful in winning the titles. On the August 24 episode of NXT, Elektra Lopez made her debut helping Legado Del Fantasma win against Hit Row. In April 2020 Mendoza's name would be changed to Cruz Del Toro.

On the October 7 episode of SmackDown, Del Toro alongside Wilde and Escobar would join Zelina Vega on the SmackDown brand. On the March 10 episode of Smackdown, Del Toro alongside the rest of Legado Del Fantasma helped Rey Mysterio against The Judgment Day, turning face in the process.

Championships and accomplishments 
Desastre Total Ultraviolento
DTU Alto Impacto Championship (1 time)
 Pro Wrestling Illustrated
 Ranked No. 309 of the top 500 singles wrestlers in the PWI 500 in 2016
 Pro Wrestling Noah
 Noah Wrestling Camp (2014)
Xtrem Mexican Wrestling
 XMW International Cup (2012)

References

External links
WWE profile
Cagematch profile

1991 births
Living people
Mexican male professional wrestlers
Masked wrestlers
Professional wrestlers from Veracruz
Sportspeople from Córdoba, Veracruz
21st-century professional wrestlers